Forgotten Realms modules and sourcebooks are modules (adventures) and sourcebooks (campaign setting information) printed for the Forgotten Realms campaign setting in the Dungeons & Dragons fantasy role-playing game.

Modules

AD&D modules coded by letter (1978–1994)
FA—Forgotten Realms Adventures are stand-alone 2nd Ed. AD&D modules set in Forgotten Realms.

FM—Forgotten Realms Maztica are stand-alone 2nd Ed. AD&D modules set in Maztica.

FRA—Forgotten Realms Adventure, or the Empires Adventures Trilogy, is a series of modules for use with The Horde expansion campaign for 2nd Ed. AD&D Forgotten Realms.

FRC—Forgotten Realms Companion (or Computer) are modules related to SSI computer games and form a linked sequence.

FRE—Forgotten Realms Epic are modules loosely based on the Avatar Trilogy of Forgotten Realms novels.

FRM—Forgotten Realms Mission

FROA—Forgotten Realms Oriental Adventures are modules set in Forgotten Realms that require the Oriental Adventures hardcover.

FRQ—Forgotten Realms Quest are stand-alone modules for 2nd Ed. AD&D set in Forgotten Realms.

H—The Bloodstone Pass Saga is a linked campaign series that focuses on using Battlesystem battles in Forgotten Realms AD&D adventures.

LC—Living City

N—Novice

OA—Oriental Adventures was originally its own campaign setting (see FROA series above), but from OA5 was incorporated into Forgotten Realms.

Other AD&D modules (1992–2000)

3rd edition adventures

4th edition adventures
FR—Forgotten Realms adventures were designed for use with 4th edition Dungeons & Dragons in the Forgotten Realms campaign setting.

5th edition adventures

Sourcebooks

Advanced Dungeons & Dragons 1st edition
The Forgotten Realms Campaign Set was written by Ed Greenwood, with Jeff Grubb and Karen Martin, and published as a boxed set in 1987.
City System (1988)
Lords of Darkness (1988)

Advanced Dungeons & Dragons 2nd edition
FR—Forgotten Realms are sourcebooks describing aspects of Forgotten Realms, rather than traditional modules. FR1–6 are for 1st Ed. AD&D, FR7–16 for 2nd Ed.

FOR-Forgotten Realms Accessories are designed for the Realms universe.

FRS—Forgotten Realms Sourcebook are 2nd Ed. AD&D sourcebooks for use with Forgotten Realms.

Aurora's Whole Realms Catalog (1992)
Cormyr (1994) - Translated into German and reviewed in Envoyer magazine #26.
Demihuman Deities (1998)
Drizzt Do'Urden's Guide to the Underdark (1999)
Drizzt Do'Urden's Guide to the Underdark was published by Wizards of the Coast, written by Eric L. Boyd, and published in 1999.  It details the Underdark in the north and west of Faerûn, including the city of Menzoberranzan. The book has Drizzt Do'Urden as its nominal guide.  The guide starts with an introduction that defines the physical boundaries of the Underdark, and also describes the intent and organization of the book and gives a brief list of D&D materials which have a strong connection to the Underdark.  A critical review describes it as "...the single-most comprehensive sourcebook on the realms of the Underdark that lie beneath the Sword Coast.  It talks about the major peoples of the Underworld and details dozens of cities, including Menzoberranzan". It further states, "...Boyd's extensive research results in Underdark being full of tiny references."
Elminster's Ecologies Appendix I: The Battle of Bones / Hill of Lost Souls (1995)
Elminster's Ecologies Appendix II: The High Moor / The Serpent Hills (1995)
Faiths & Avatars (1996)
Forgotten Realms Adventures (1990)
The Forgotten Realms Atlas (1990)
Forgotten Realms Campaign Setting (1993, 1996)
Heroes' Lorebook (1995)
The Horde (1990)
Maztica Campaign Set (1991)
Netheril: Empire of Magic (1996)
The North: Guide to the Savage Frontier (1996)
Player's Guide to the Forgotten Realms Campaign (1993)
Sea of Fallen Stars (1999) - Reviewed in Envoyer magazine #38
Spellbound (1995)
The Ruins of Myth Drannor (1993)
The Ruins of Undermountain (1991)
Ruins of Zhentil Keep (1995)
The Vilhon Reach (1996)
Villains' Lorebook (1998)
Volo's Guide to All Things Magical (1996)
Volo's Guide to Cormyr (1995)
Volo's Guide to the Dalelands (1996)
Volo's Guide to the Dalelands details the Dalelands, with its guide Volo taking readers from Daggerdale in the North through to the High Dale in the South. Volo's rating system goes by five pipes or tankards to indicate a top tavern, five coins to mean high prices, and five daggers a dangerous place to hang out. Locations and characters described in the book can be used as foundations on which proper Dalelands scenarios can be built.  This is the fifth installment of Volo's guides to the Forgotten Realms.  Trenton Webb reviewed Volo's Guide to the Dalelands for Arcane magazine, rating it a 6 out of 10 overall.
Volo's Guide to the Sword Coast (1994)
Volo's Guide to Waterdeep (1993)

Dungeons & Dragons 3rd edition

Dungeons & Dragons 4th edition
Wizards of the Coast released the Forgotten Realms Campaign Guide in August 2008, and the Forgotten Realms Player's Guide in September 2008.

Ed Greenwood Presents Elminster's Forgotten Realms, published in October of 2012 as an edition neutral sourcebook, as Wizards of the Coast transitioned Dungeons and Dragons for 4th edition to 5th edition.

Dungeons & Dragons 5th edition
 Sword Coast Adventurer's Guide
 Volo's Guide to Monsters
 Xanathar's Guide to Everything
 Mordenkainen's Tome of Foes
 Tasha's Cauldron of Everything
 Elemental Evil Player's Companion

Notes

References

Dungeons & Dragons modules
Forgotten Realms
Forgotten Realms